Brooke Williams (born 3 January 1984) is a New Zealand actress, best known for her role as Jennsen Rahl in Legend of the Seeker, Aurelia in Spartacus: Blood and Sand and Eva in The Almighty Johnsons.

Early life and education 
Williams was born in Christchurch, where she spent her childhood. At a very young age, she decided to become an actress and started performing in amateur theatre and attending acting courses.

She moved to London, where, starting in 2001, she trained at Mme Course, Acting for Screen and the Globe Theatre, joining its theatre company. In 2002 she participated in the Edinburgh Festival Fringe acting in Gogo the Boy with Magic Feet, for which she won a Total Theatre Award. After returning to New Zealand, she worked at the Court Theatre in Christchurch; she moved North in 2004 and graduated with a Bachelor of Performing Arts from Toi Whakaari: New Zealand Drama School in 2006.

Career
In 2007 she moved to Auckland, where she joined the Auckland Theatre Company, playing the lead role in Romeo & Juliet.

Her television career began in 2005, acting in the movie Meet Me in Miami; then appearing in the television series Spartacus: Blood and Sand, its prequel Spartacus: Gods of the Arena and Legend of the Seeker. In 2008, Williams acted in a spot for Griffin Solay. Two years later, she won two NZ Herald Best of Theatre Awards.

In 2011, she appeared in the video of the song Myth Reducer by Sleeping Dogs and joined Shortland Street, playing Lana. In 2012, Williams portraited Aurelia in Spartacus: Vengeance again.

She resigned from Shortland Street in early 2013.

Filmography

Theatre

Other roles

Awards and nominations

References

External links 
 
 
 Brooke Williams at Aucklandactors.co.nz.

1984 births
21st-century New Zealand actresses
Living people
New Zealand film actresses
New Zealand soap opera actresses
New Zealand television actresses
People from Christchurch
Toi Whakaari alumni